Melissa Ludtke (born May 27, 1951) is an American journalist. In 1978, as a young sports journalist, Ludtke won a lawsuit for the right to be allowed in Major League Baseball locker rooms.

Early life 
Ludtke was born in Iowa City, Iowa, but grew up in Amherst, Massachusetts. She was the oldest of five children, her father worked at the University of Massachusetts where he taught finance, and her mother earned a Ph.D. in anthropology. Ludtke attended Wellesley College in Wellesley, MA and graduated in 1973 with a Bachelor of Arts in Art History.

Career 

Ludtke always had a passion for sports, and upon graduation, she began working for ABC Sports and Sports Illustrated.

Ludtke was a writer and editor for the Nieman Reports magazine of Harvard University's Nieman Foundation for Journalism from 1998 to 2011. She then served as the Executive Director of the Schuster Institute for Investigative Journalism at Brandeis University from 2011 to 2013. Before her editor job at the Nieman Foundation, she had been a correspondent with Time magazine and a reporter/researcher with Sports Illustrated and with CBS News.

In July 2013, Ludtke was featured in Let Them Wear Towels, a short documentary on females working in male locker rooms by Anne Sundberg and Ricki Stern.

Court case against Major League Baseball 

Ludtke was a plaintiff in a federal lawsuit, Melissa Ludtke and Time, Inc., Plaintiffs, v. Bowie Kuhn, Commissioner of Baseball et al. (1978) that is credited with giving equal access to Major League Baseball locker rooms to women sports reporters. In 1977, Ludtke sued the baseball commission on the basis that her 14th amendment rights were violated when she was denied access to the New York Yankees clubhouse while reporting on the 1977 World Series. She won the lawsuit. The United States District Court for the Southern District of New York stated her fourteenth amendment right was violated since the New York Yankees clubhouse was controlled by New York City. That court also stated that her fundamental right to pursue a career was violated based on her sex.

When asked how the case, Ludtke vs. Kuhn, has impacted journalism she said "It increased enormously the number of young women who came into sports media — as reporters, as employees of sports teams and league offices, in agencies representing athletes and in other aspects of sports work that earlier generations of women had not been involved with, such as working as team trainers or as umpires."

Honors 
In 2010, Ludtke received the Yankee Quill Award, the highest individual honor bestowed on a journalist in New England. At Sports Illustrated, she was given a Front Page Award, and at Time was the recipient of several journalism awards. In 2012, Ludtke was nominated by the New York University Arthur L. Carter Journalism Institute as one of the "100 Outstanding Journalists in the United States in the Last 100 Years".

Personal life 
In 1978, Ludtke married sportswriter Eric Lincoln. In 1982, Ludtke and Lincoln divorced.

Ludtke has a daughter, whom she adopted as a baby girl from China.

Works and publications

References

Further reading

External links 
 
 Papers of Melissa Ludtke, 1977-1997 at Arthur and Elizabeth Schlesinger Library, Radcliffe Institute for Advanced Study, Harvard University
 
 

Living people
1951 births
American women sportswriters
American women journalists
American women's rights activists
Writers from Iowa City, Iowa
Wellesley College alumni